Ko Klang is an island in tambon Khlong Prasong, Mueang Krabi District, Krabi Province, Thailand.

Orientation
Ko Klang is located on the west coast of southern Thailand at the mouth of Krabi River in the Andaman Sea. The island is only accessible via longtail boats from the nearby town of Krabi. These boats launch from two piers: Chaofa Pier (in the centre of Krabi town) and Tara Pier (south of Krabi town). Crossings take less than 10 minutes.

The island has an area of 26 square kilometres (16,250 rai) and is divided into four areas, with one village and one mosque in each:
 Moo 1: Ban Ko Klang
 Moo 2: Ban Khlong Prasong
 Moo 3: Ban Khlongkam
 Moo 4: Ban Bang Kanun
(*Moo = group; Ban = village)

Transport
The Department of Rural Roads plans to build a 1.95 km suspended bridge connecting Ban Hua Hin in Ko Klang District to Ko Lanta. If approved, the bridge will be completed by 2025.
Cars are not used on the island; the locals use only motorbikes, bicycles or auto-rickshaws.

Demographics
As of 2010, the population of the island was around 4,700 people from 915 families. 70% of the population are indigenous to the island. The inhabitants are 98% Muslim and 2% Buddhist.

Economy
Ko Klang has an ocean based economy. Many of the inhabitants are boatmen who transport locals to and from Krabi town, or transport tourists to the surrounding islands. The majority of the population also fish in the river or in Andaman Sea. Prawns, fish and crab are caught in local waters. There are fish farms on the island. Handicrafts, such as batik fabrics, are also produced locally. Some men specialize in the construction of miniature longtail boats, most of which are sold to tourists as souvenirs.

Environment
The environment is varied, from mangrove forests to rice fields, as well as, caves, beaches, and Krabi's famous limestone mountains.

Mangrove forests occupy 80 percent of the island and are on the north and east coasts of the island. The flora includes mangrove trees such as Rhizophora mucronata, the mangrove date palm Phoenix paludosa, and plants such as Lumnitzera.

The fauna is also diversified and includes the long-tailed macaque, the Oriental small-clawed otter, and several snake species.

Many species of birds can be spotted along the coastline such as the endangered Chinese egret, Egretta eulophotes. Birds such as the grey heron, the masked finefoot, the spotted greenshank, the roseate tern, the sea eagle, the kingfisher and the stork make their home on the coastline.

Crabs and shell-dwelling molluscs also share the beaches, and can be seen moving about the sand at low tide.
 
On the water the number of fish decreases from year to year because of pollution and overfishing. Despite this, there are still fish species such as the milkfish, the barramundi, and the Indo-Pacific tarpon.

The island itself is flat and has many canals. It is an ideal place for rice fields, which play a very important role for the village and its economy. Coconut trees are in abundance. Raising both fish and ducks is common. Water buffaloes and goats are also seen grazing year round.

Climate
The tropical climate of Thailand has only two seasons: the dry season from November to May and the rainy season from June to October. The average temperate is 28 degrees Celsius (82.4 degrees Fahrenheit), though temperatures can rise up to 34-37 degrees (93.2-98.6 Fahrenheit) during the hot season.

References

Geography of Krabi province
Islands of Thailand